Aomen may refer to:
 Aomen (Bikini Atoll), an island in the Pacific Ocean
 Àomén, or Macau, a special administrative region of China